Zachary Sukunda (born June 24, 1995) is a Canadian soccer player who plays as a full-back for Finnish club PEPO.

Career

FC Montreal
Sukunda was part of the Montreal Impact Academy from 2012 to 2014. He made his professional debut for FC Montreal on April 18, 2015 in a 2-1 defeat to Harrisburg City Islanders. Sukunda would primarily play as a fullback during the 2015 season. Sukunda played two seasons with FC Montreal before the club ceased operations after the 2016 season.

Umeå FC
Rather than pursue other opportunities in the USL, Sukunda signed with Division 1 Norra club Umeå FC in March 2017, joining former FC Montreal teammate Yann-Alexandre Fillion, who was with the club on loan.

Hume City
In December 2017, Sukunda announced that he signed with Hume City FC of the NPL Victoria.

Northcote City
In June 2018, Sukunda joined Northcote City FC.

HFX Wanderers
On 29 November 2018, Sukunda was announced as HFX Wanderers FC first signing. On 14 December 2019, the club announced that Sukunda would not be returning for the 2020 season.

Ekenäs IF
On December 21, 2019, Sukunda signed with Finnish Ykkönen side Ekenäs IF for the 2020 season.

References

External links

1995 births
Living people
Association football fullbacks
Canadian soccer players
Soccer players from Ottawa
Franco-Ontarian people
Canadian expatriate soccer players
Expatriate footballers in France
Canadian expatriate sportspeople in France
Expatriate footballers in Sweden
Canadian expatriate sportspeople in Sweden
Expatriate soccer players in Australia
Canadian expatriate sportspeople in Australia
Expatriate footballers in Finland
Canadian expatriate sportspeople in Finland
AJ Auxerre players
Montreal Impact U23 players
FC Montreal players
Umeå FC players
Hume City FC players
Northcote City FC players
HFX Wanderers FC players
Ekenäs IF players
Canadian Soccer League (1998–present) players
USL Championship players
Ettan Fotboll players
Victorian Premier League players
Canadian Premier League players
Ykkönen players